The 1999 Oldham Council election took place on 6 May 1999 to elect members of  Oldham Metropolitan Borough Council in Greater Manchester, England. One third of the council was up for election and the Labour Party stayed in overall control of the council.

After the election, the composition of the council was:
Labour 33
Liberal Democrat 26
Conservative 1

Election result
Overall turnout in the election was 32.7%.

Ward results

References

1999 English local elections
1999
1990s in Greater Manchester